Hugh Calveley (died June 1393) was an English soldier and gentleman, with an estate in Calveley and Mottram St. Andrew, Cheshire.

He was the son of David Calveley of Calveley and Mottram St. Andrew by his wife Agnes. He was a nephew of the military commander Sir Hugh Calveley, and likely followed him into military service. He was a Member (MP) of the Parliament of England for Rutland in 1385 and 1390.

Family
About 1381, he married Agnes, daughter and heiress of Sir Laurence Hauberk (d.1381), of Stapleford, Leicestershire, by Margaret, daughter and coheiress of Roger Cheyne of Salop. They has two sons:
David, who died young
Hugh, who inherited his great uncle's estate

References

Year of birth missing
1393 deaths
English MPs 1385
English MPs January 1390
14th-century English politicians
14th-century English lawyers
People from Cheshire